The 2016 Houston Baptist Huskies football team represented Houston Baptist University—now known as Houston Christian University—as a member of the Southland Conference during the 2016 NCAA Division I FCS football season. Led by fourth-year head coach Vic Shealy the Huskies compiled an overall record of 4–7 with a mark of 4–5 in conference play, placing seventh in the Southland. Houston Baptist played home games at Husky Stadium in Houston.

Previous season
The Huskies finished the 2015 season with a 2–9 overall record and a 0–8 record in Southland Conference play to finish in 11th place.

Schedule

* Games were televised on tape delay.

Game summaries

@ Central Arkansas

Sources:

Texas Southern

Sources:

Abilene Christian

Sources:

Sam Houston State

Sources:

@ Western Kentucky

Sources:

Nicholls

Sources:

@ Southeastern Louisiana

Sources:

@ Lamar

Sources:

@ UTEP

Sources:

Stephen F. Austin

Sources:

@ Incarnate Word

Sources: Box Score

References

Houston Baptist
Houston Christian Huskies football seasons
Houston Baptist Huskies football